Chiba Korean Primary and Junior High School (千葉朝鮮初中級学校 Chiba Chōsen Shochūkyūgakkō) is a North Korea-aligned Korean international school in Hanamigawa-ku, Chiba, Chiba Prefecture, Japan, in the Tokyo metropolitan area. , the principal is Kim Yu-sop. The school uses the Korean language as its language of instruction. The school operates under the authority of the Chongryon.

History
The school first opened in the 1940s. Historically the Chongryon provided most of the school's funding. It previously received some funding from the North Korean central government, and an additional 20% of its budget came from Japanese government subsidies. When the North Korean government received United Nations sanctions its funding stopped.

Student body
, it had 86 primary school (ages 5–12) students.

See also
 List of junior high schools in Chiba Prefecture
 List of elementary schools in Chiba Prefecture

References

External links
 Chiba Korean Primary and Junior High School 

Elementary schools in Japan
Schools in Chiba (city)
North Korean schools in Japan